Richard Fred Luecken (born November 15, 1960) is an American former professional baseball relief pitcher. He played in Major League Baseball (MLB) for the Kansas City Royals, Atlanta Braves and Toronto Blue Jays.

Career
Luecken attended Texas A&M University, and in 1982 he played collegiate summer baseball with the Orleans Cardinals of the Cape Cod Baseball League.

He was selected by the Seattle Mariners in the 27th round of the 1983 MLB Draft. Luecken pitched four seasons in the Mariners Minor League system before being traded along with Danny Tartabull to Kansas City in exchange for Scott Bankhead, Mike Kingery and Steve Shields.

In 1989, Luecken posted a 2-1 record with one save and a 3.42 earned run average in 19 relief appearances with the Royals.

Before the 1990 season, Luecken was traded along with Charlie Leibrandt to Atlanta for Gerald Perry and one minor leaguer. He went 1-4 with a 5.77 ERA in 36 games and was traded by the Braves late in the year to Toronto.

References

External links

Rick Luecken at The Baseball Gauge
Venezuela Winter League

1960 births
Living people
American expatriate baseball players in Canada
Atlanta Braves players
Baseball players from Texas
Bellingham Mariners players
Calgary Cannons players
Chattanooga Lookouts players
Iowa Cubs players
Kansas City Royals players
Leones del Caracas players
American expatriate baseball players in Venezuela
Major League Baseball pitchers
Memphis Chicks players
Omaha Royals players
Orleans Firebirds players
People from McAllen, Texas
Richmond Braves players
Texas A&M Aggies baseball players
Toronto Blue Jays players